Kareen Antonn (born Kareen Antonopoulou on 24 May 1980 in Nogent-sur-Marne, France) is a French singer of Greek and Spanish origin.

In 2003, she recorded a pair of duets with British singer Bonnie Tyler; "Si demain... (Turn Around)" and "Si Tout s'arrête (It's a Heartache)", both French/English covers of "Total Eclipse of the Heart" and "It's a Heartache", respectively. She also recorded "Un Homme se blesse" to help the homeless.

Discography

Albums
 2006: Kareen Antonn (Sterne /Sonybmg)

Singles
 2003: "Si demain... (Turn Around)" – No. 1 Belgium (Wallonia), No. 1 France, No. 1 Poland (airplay), No. 3 Europe, No. 155 Russia (airplay), No. 7 Switzerland
 2004: "Si tout s'arrête (It's a Heartache)" – No. 7 Belgium (Wallonia), No. 12 France, No. 10 Poland (airplay), No. 25 Switzerland
 2004: "John'"
 2006: "Quand on veut, on peut"
 2007: "Un Homme se blesse"

References

External links
 Official site

1980 births
Living people
French people of Greek descent
French people of Spanish descent
People from Nogent-sur-Marne
French women pop singers
21st-century French singers
21st-century French women singers